Canalisation is a measure of the ability of a population to produce the same phenotype regardless of variability of its environment or genotype. It is a form of evolutionary robustness. The term was coined in 1942 by C. H. Waddington to capture the fact that "developmental reactions, as they occur in organisms submitted to natural selection...are adjusted so as to bring about one definite end-result regardless of minor variations in conditions during the course of the reaction". He used this word rather than robustness to take into account that biological systems are not robust in quite the same way as, for example, engineered systems.

Biological robustness or canalisation comes about when developmental pathways are shaped by evolution. Waddington introduced the concept of the epigenetic landscape, in which the state of an organism rolls "downhill" during development. In this metaphor, a canalised trait is illustrated as a valley (which he called a creode) enclosed by high ridges, safely guiding the phenotype to its "fate". Waddington claimed that canals form in the epigenetic landscape during evolution, and that this heuristic is useful for understanding the unique qualities of biological robustness.

Genetic assimilation

Waddington used the concept of canalisation to explain his experiments on genetic assimilation. In these experiments, he exposed Drosophila pupae to heat shock. This environmental disturbance caused some flies to develop a crossveinless phenotype. He then selected for crossveinless. Eventually, the crossveinless phenotype appeared even without heat shock. Through this process of genetic assimilation, an environmentally induced phenotype had become inherited. Waddington explained this as the formation of a new canal in the epigenetic landscape.

It is, however, possible to explain genetic assimilation using only quantitative genetics and a threshold model, with no reference to the concept of canalisation. However, theoretical models that incorporate a complex genotype–phenotype map have found evidence for the evolution of phenotypic robustness contributing to genetic assimilation, even when selection is only for developmental stability and not for a particular phenotype, and so the quantitative genetics models do not apply. These studies suggest that the canalisation heuristic may still be useful, beyond the more simple concept of robustness.

Congruence hypothesis

Neither canalisation nor robustness are simple quantities to quantify: it is always necessary to specify which trait is canalised (robust) to which perturbations. For example, perturbations can come either from the environment or from mutations. It has been suggested that different perturbations have congruent effects on development taking place on an epigenetic landscape. This could, however, depend on the molecular mechanism responsible for robustness, and be different in different cases.

Evolutionary capacitance

The canalisation metaphor suggests that some phenotypic traits are very robust to small perturbations, for which development does not exit the canal, and rapidly returns down, with little effect on the final outcome of development. But perturbations whose magnitude exceeds a certain threshold will break out of the canal, moving the developmental process into uncharted territory. For instance, the study of an allelic series for Fgf8, an important gene for craniofacial development, with decreasing levels of gene expression demonstrated that the phenotype remains canalised as long as the expression level is above 40% of the wild-type expression. 

Strong robustness up to a limit, with little robustness beyond, is a pattern that could increase evolvability in a fluctuating environment. Canalisation of a large set of genotypes into a limited phenotypic space has been suggested as a mechanism for the accumulation, in a neutral manner, of mutations that could otherwise be deleterious. Genetic canalisation could allow for evolutionary capacitance, where genetic diversity accumulates in a population over time, sheltered from natural selection because it does not normally affect phenotypes. This hidden diversity could then be unleashed by extreme changes in the environment or by molecular switches, releasing previously cryptic genetic variation that can then contribute to a rapid burst of evolution, a phenomenon termed decanalisation. Cycles of canalization-decanalization could explain the alternating periods of stasis, where genotypic diversity accumulates without morphological changes, followed by rapid morphological changes, where decanalization releases the phenotypic diversity and becomes subject to natural selection, in the fossil record, thus providing a potential developmental explanation for the punctuated equilibrium.

HSP90 and decanalisation 
In 1998, Susan Lindquist discovered that Drosophila hsp83 heterozygous mutants exhibit a large diversity of phenotypes (from sexual combs on the head, to scutoid-like and notched wings phenotypes). She showed that these phenotypes could be passed on to the next generation, suggesting a genetic basis for those phenotypes. The authors hypothesized that Hsp90 (the gene mutated in hsp83), as a chaperone protein, plays a pivotal role in the folding and activation of many proteins involved in developmental signaling pathways, thus buffering against genetic variation in those pathways. hsp83 mutants would therefore release the cryptic genetic variation, resulting in a diversity of phenotypes.

In 2002, Lindquist showed that pharmacological inhibition of HSP90 in Arabidopsis thaliana also lead to a wide range of phenotypes, some of which could be considered adaptive, further supporting the canalising role of HSP90. 

Finally, the same type of experiment in the cavefish Astyanax mexicanus yielded similar results. This species encompasses two populations: an eyed population living under the water surface and an eye-less blind population living in caves. Not only is the cave population eye-less but it also displays a largely reduced orbit size. HSP90 inhibition leads to an increased variation in orbit size that could explain how this trait could evolve in just a few generations. Further analysis showed that low conductivity in the cave water induces a stress response mimicking the inhibition of HSP90, providing a mechanism for decanalisation. 

It is worth noting that interpretation of the original Drosophila paper is now subject to controversy. Molecular analysis of the hsp83 mutant showed that HSP90 is required for piRNA biogenesis, a set of small RNAs repressing transposons in the germline. , causing massive transposon insertional mutagenesis that could explain the phenotypic diversification.

Significance of Variability of Components

Understanding variability is an extremely important aspect of understanding natural selection and mutations. Variability can be classified into two categories the first is modulating phenotypic variation and the second is modulating the phenotypes that are produced. While this so call bias found in genetic variability is found the study allows us to further understand how certain phenotypes are more successful into its actual morphology, biochemical makeup, or behavior. It is scientifically known that organisms have to developed systematically into integrated systems in order to thrive in their specific ecosystem. This splays to morphology in the order of variations as well as if the variations are not done in a systematic order the phenotypic mutation will not last as natural selection will occur. This variation effects the speed and rate of evolutionary change due to the selection and modulation of the phenotypic variations This ultimately lows the amount of diversity seen through evolution as the majority of phenotypes never make it more than a couple generations due to their inferior basis of either morphology, biochemical makeup, or physical movement or appearance.

See also 
Developmental noise
Phenotypic integration
Phenotypic plasticity
Developmental systems theory
Gene regulatory network
Systems biology

References 

Developmental biology
Extended evolutionary synthesis
Population genetics